Joly-Normandin is a motion picture film format.

It was developed by Henri Joly and Ernest Normandin

See also
List of motion picture film formats

References

External links
 Differing Formats

Film formats
Standards of France